In Satan's Name: The Definitive Collection is a 1997 compilation album by British rock band Atomic Rooster. It was released on the Recall Records label (a subsidiary of Snapper Music).

Alongside Heavy Soul, it is one of only two fully licensed collections to span all five of the band's 1970s albums.

Track listing 

CD 1

 "Banstead" (Crane/Graham/Palmer) 3:35
 "And So to Bed" (Crane) 4:13
 "Friday the 13th" (Crane) 3:32
 "Broken Wings" (John Jerome/Bernhard Grun) 5:49
 "Tomorrow Night" (Crane) 4:00
 "Play the Game" (Du Cann) 4:41
 "VUG" (Crane) 5:01
 "Sleeping for Years" (Du Cann) 5:29
 "Death Walks Behind You" (Du Cann/Crane) 7:22
 "Devil's Answer" (Du Cann) 3:29
 "The Rock" (Crane) 4:33
 "Breakthrough" (Crane/Darnell) 6:18
 "Break the Ice" (Du Cann) 5:06
 "A Spoonful of Bromide Helps the Pulse Rate Go Down" (Crane) 4:37

CD 2

 "Stand by Me" (Crane) 3:50
 "Never To Lose" (Bolton) 3:20
 "Don't Know What Went Wrong" (Crane) 4.02
 "Space Cowboy" (Bolton) 3:23
 "People You Can't Trust" (Crane) 3:55
 "All in Satan's Name" (Parnell) 4:46
 "Close Your Eyes" (Crane) 3:50
 "Save Me" (Crane) 3:17 – rerecorded, retitled version of "Friday the 13th"
 "Can't Find a Reason" (Crane) 4:29
 "Ear in the Snow" (Crane) 6:15
 "All Across the Country" (Crane) 5:11
 "Voodoo in You" (Avery) 7:07
 "Goodbye Planet Earth" (Mandala) 4:10
 "Satan's Wheel" (Crane) 6:34

Atomic Rooster compilation albums
1997 compilation albums